Mauro Andrés Da Luz Regalado (born September 5, 1994) is a Uruguayan footballer who plays for Club 9 de Octubre on loan from Uruguayan side River Plate.

Career
Da Luz began his career in 2016 with River Plate Montevideo, where he is currently playing. Briefly, he has played for Argentinian Colón on loan, since October 2019 until summer 2020.

References

1994 births
Living people
Uruguayan footballers
Uruguayan expatriate footballers
Association football forwards
Club Atlético River Plate (Montevideo) players
Club Atlético Colón footballers
Uruguayan Primera División players
Argentine Primera División players
Uruguayan expatriate sportspeople in Argentina
Expatriate footballers in Argentina
Uruguayan people of Brazilian descent